Dara Hassanien (born 1 April 1996) is an Egyptian synchronized swimmer. She competed in the women's duet at the 2016 Summer Olympics. Hassanien was a member of the Egyptian synchronized swimming team that beat Australia at the 2016 Summer Olympics, which was one of their goals.

References

1996 births
Living people
Egyptian synchronized swimmers
Olympic synchronized swimmers of Egypt
Synchronized swimmers at the 2016 Summer Olympics
Place of birth missing (living people)